This is a list of Estonian television related events from 1989.

Events

Debuts

Television shows

Ending this year

Births
8 February - Karl-Andreas Kalmet, actor
2 April - Liis Lass, actress
1 March - Karl-Erik Taukar, singer and TV host
16 May - Pääru Oja, actor

Deaths
14 December - Ants Eskola, actor and director